Basin (foaled  May 12, 2017) is an American Thoroughbred racehorse and the winner of the 2019 Hopeful Stakes.

Career

Basin's first race was on June 14, 2019 at Churchill Downs, where he came in second. He earned his first victory in his second start on July 21, 2019 at Saratoga Race Course where he won a Maiden Special Weight race.

Basin competed in his first Grade 1 race on September 2, 2019, where he won the 2019 Hopeful Stakes.

His 2020 season was an up and down season. He came in third place in the March 14, 2020 Grade 2 Rebel Stakes and then came in fourth in the ungraded April 11, 2020 Oaklawn Stakes.

On May 2, 2020, he came back with a win in the Grade 1 Arkansas Derby, after Charlatan, the original winner, was disqualified, but in July 2020, came in a disappointing 10th in the Blue Grass Stakes. The Arkansas Derby win helped put him in the running on the 2020 Road to the Kentucky Derby.

On April 20, 2021, Charlatan's victory in the 2020 Arkansas Derby was restored.

Pedigree

References

2017 racehorse births